Standing Room Only (SRO) is an entertainment series on HBO that premiered on June 19, 1976. Shows featured concerts, burlesque shows, ventriloquism programs, magic shows and more. From 1982 to 1986, a version of the "HBO in Space" program opening sequence was used to introduce the series.

Partial list of programs
 Bette Midler
 Victor Borge
 Totie Fields
 Paul Anka
 Neil Sedaka
 Casino De Paris
 Barry Manilow
 Diana Ross
 Liza Minnelli
 Kenny Rogers
 Cher
 Linda Ronstadt
 George Burns
 Crystal Gayle
 Billy Joel
 Willie Nelson
 Olivia Newton-John
 Simon and Garfunkel
 David Bowie
 Dolly Parton
 Red Skelton: A Royal Performance
 Christmas in New York
 Johnny Cash
 Abracadabra, It's Magic
 Daredevils
 Vanities
 Country Rock '82
 Freddie the Freeloader's Christmas Dinner
 Red Skelton's More Funny Faces Starring Marcel Marceau
 An Evening at the Moulin Rouge
 The Last Great Vaudeville Show
 Milton Berle's Magic of the Stars
 Sherlock Holmes

See also
 HBO
 On Location
 List of programs broadcast by HBO

References

External links
 Article on HBO's Standing Room Only first show

HBO original programming
1976 American television series debuts
1970s American variety television series
English-language television shows
HBO Shows (series) WITHOUT Episode info, list, or Article